Kevin Codfert is the current keyboardist of the band Adagio. He joined the band in 2003, working on the album Underworld. He is the producer of progressive metal band Myrath, which met with the band during Rock Festival in Tunisia in December 2006. Codfert collaborated with Stéphan Forté (guitarist of Adagio) on his solo project, and also with the band Venturia.

Discography

Myrath 
 Hope (full-length, 2007)
 Desert Call (full-length, 2009)
 Tales of the Sands (full-length, 2011)
 Legacy (full-length, 2016)
 Shehili (full-length, 2019)

Adagio 

 Underworld (full-length, 2003)
 A Band in Upperworld, (live, 2004)
 Dominate (full-length, 2006)
 Archangels in Black (full-length, 2009)
 Life (full-length, 2017)

Productions 

 Legacy – Myrath (full-length, 2016)
 The Shadows Compendium – Stéphan Forté (full-length, 2011)
 Tales of the Sands – Myrath (full-length, 2011)
 Archangels in Black – Adagio (full-length, 2009)
 Trapped – Julien Damotte (full-length, 2009)
 Desert Call – Myrath (full-length, 2009)
 Megantrop – Qantice Forte (full-length, 2009)
 Hybrid – Venturia (full-length, 2008)
 taï Phong – taï Phong (full-length, 2008)
 On the Edge – BO TF1 composée par Pierre Arnoux (full-length, 2008)
 Hope – Myrath (full-length, 2007)
 Venturia – Venturia (full-length, 2006)
 Dominate – Adagio (full-length, 2006)

Orchestral arrangements 

 Machine Messiah – Sepultura 2017

Guest 

 Myrath – Hope 2007
 Stéphan Forté

External links 
 Official website (archived)

1976 births
French keyboardists
Living people
Musicians from Paris
Adagio (band) members